Netrokona-3 is a constituency represented in the Jatiya Sangsad (National Parliament) of Bangladesh since 2019 by Ashim Kumar Ukil of the Awami League.

Boundaries 
The constituency encompasses Atpara and Kendua upazilas.

History 
The constituency was created in 1984 from a Mymensingh constituency when the former Mymensingh District was split into four districts: Mymensingh, Sherpur, Netrokona, and Kishoreganj.

Members of Parliament

Elections

Elections in the 2010s

Elections in the 2000s 

Nurul Amin Talukdar died in June 2003. Khadija Amin, his widow, was elected in an August 2003 by-election.

Elections in the 1990s

References

External links
 

Parliamentary constituencies in Bangladesh
Netrokona District